Ancistrotus uncinatus is a species of beetle in the family Cerambycidae. It is endemic to Brazil, specifically southeast Minas Gerais and Santa Catarina.

References 

Prioninae